Catherine Kieu (March 10, 1963) , also known as Catherine Kieu Becker, is an American woman who was convicted of torture and aggravated mayhem in 2013 for mutilating her husband's genitalia. The couple had been in the process of getting a divorce, but had continued to share their condominium. During the trial, the prosecution argued that Kieu assaulted her husband because he had re-established a relationship with an ex-girlfriend of his; the defense argued it was because of sexual and emotional abuse.

Overview
Kieu was accused of drugging her husband, cutting off his penis with a 10-inch kitchen knife, and putting it in a garbage disposal to prevent reattachment on July 11, 2011. Kieu called the police after the incident. When they arrived her husband was in bed, bleeding and tied down. He had emergency surgery at UC Irvine Medical Center, and was released, but did not have his penis reattached. He is able to urinate, but unable to have sexual intercourse. He stated at trial that as a result of the assault and permanent injury to his genitalia, he felt as if he had been murdered.

The responding police had not determined a clear motive for Kieu's actions, but Kieu's husband filed for divorce in May, 2011, and the couple remained together in their Garden Grove condominium. KTLA reported that they were married December 29, 2009 and had been married 16 months. Kieu was charged with false imprisonment, assault with a deadly weapon, aggravated mayhem, poisoning, administering a drug with intent to commit a felony, and spousal abuse.  She was held in an Orange County, California jail on a $1 million bond.

Trial
The case went to trial in April 2013 and Kieu was indicted of torture and aggravated mayhem. She pleaded not guilty. During the trial, the prosecution alleged that Kieu committed the crime because her husband had re-established a relationship with an ex-girlfriend and filed for divorce. Frank Bittar, her public defender, argued that Kieu had been subjected to sexual and verbal abuse. During her childhood in Vietnam, Kieu had been subjected to molestation and other abuse. Bittar stated that Kieu's husband "demanded sex in ways that caused her pain" and that his client had "a break from reality" when she committed the crime. A voice activated recorder captured the event on July 11, 2011 and the audio recording was replayed in the courtroom; Kieu yelled, "You deserve it!" three times before assaulting her husband.
 
Deputy District Attorney John Christl told reporters: "This woman went to extreme lengths to destroy this man's manhood by placing it in the garbage disposal. She did this out of vengeance, vanity and jealousy."

She was found guilty on April 29, 2013 of both torture and aggravated mayhem. She was sentenced on June 28, 2013, and received life in prison with the possibility of parole after seven years. As of August 2021, she has not been granted parole and is imprisoned at the Central California Women's Facility.

Discussion on The Talk 
Sharon Osbourne and other co-hosts joked about the incident and made light of Kieu's crimes on the daytime television show  The Talk. Regarding the incident, Osbourne said "I don't know the circumstances... However, I do think it's quite fabulous." Co-host Sara Gilbert said "it is a little bit sexist. If somebody cut a woman's breast off, nobody would be sitting laughing."

See also
 Bertha Boronda
 Brigitte Harris case
 Emasculation
 Francine Hughes and The Burning Bed
 Lin and Xie case
 Penectomy
 Penis removal
 Penis transplantation
 Sada Abe
 Carlos Castro (journalist)

Notes

References

External links

1960s births
21st-century American criminals
American people convicted of torture
American prisoners and detainees
Vietnamese emigrants to the United States
Criminals from California
Incidents of violence against men
Living people
American people convicted of assault
Prisoners sentenced to life imprisonment by California
People from Garden Grove, California
Prisoners and detainees of California
Violence in California
Violence against men in North America
American female criminals